Futuro Kings FC is an Equatoguinean football club based in the city of Mongomo. It currently plays in the Liga Nacional de Fútbol. The club was founded in 2017 as a result of the merger between Malabo Kings BC (a basketball team) and Estrellas de Futuro de Mongomo (a football team).

Players

Current squad

Notable players

References

 
Association football clubs established in 2017
2017 establishments in Equatorial Guinea
Mongomo